Mentzel is a Germanic surname. Notable people with this surname include:

 Achim Mentzel (1946-2016), German actor
 Rudolf Mentzel (1900-1987), German chemist and a National Socialist science policy-maker
 Vincent Mentzel (born 1945), Dutch photographer

German-language surnames
Dutch-language surnames